The following highways are numbered 486:

Ireland
 R486 regional road

Japan
 Japan National Route 486

United States